The Troglodytae (Trōglodytai), or Troglodyti (literally "cave goers"), were people mentioned in various locations by many ancient Greek and Roman geographers and historians, including Herodotus (5th century BCE), Agatharchides (2nd century BCE), Diodorus Siculus (1st century BCE), Strabo (64/63 BCE – c.  24 CE), Pliny (1st century CE), Josephus (37 – c. 100 CE), Tacitus (c. 56 – after 117 CE), Claudius Aelianus (c. 175 CE – c. 235 CE), Porphyry (c. 234 CE – c. 305 CE).

Greco-Roman period
The earlier references allude to Trogodytes (without the l), evidently derived from Greek trōglē, cave and dytes, divers.

In Herodotus
Herodotus referred to the Troglodytae in his Histories as being a people hunted by the Garamantes in Libya. He said that the Troglodytae were the swiftest runners of all humans known and that they ate snakes, lizards, and other reptiles. He also stated that their language was unlike any known to him, and sounded like the screeching of bats. Alice Werner (1913) believed (in passing) that this was a clear allusion to the early Khoisan, indigenous inhabitants of Southern Africa, because their languages contain distinctive click sounds.

In Aristotle
According to Aristotle (Hist. An. viii. 12) a dwarfish race of Troglodytes dwelt on the upper course of the Nile, who possessed horses and were in his opinion the Pygmies of fable.

In Diodorus
In ancient writing, apparently the best known of the African cave-dwellers were the inhabitants of the "Troglodyte country" on the coast of the Red Sea, as far north as the Greek port of Berenice, of whom an account was preserved by Diodorus Siculus from Agatharchides of Cnidus, and by Artemidorus Ephesius in Strabo. They were a pastoral people, living entirely on the flesh of their herds, or, in the season of fresh pasture, on mingled milk and blood.

In Strabo
In his work Geographica, Strabo mentions a tribe of Troglodytae living along with the Crobyzi in Scythia Minor, near the Ister (Danube) and the Greek colonies of Callatis and Tomis. He also mentions tribes living in various parts of Africa from Libya to the Red Sea.

In Pomponius Mela
In his work Chorographia, Pomponius Mela mentions that they own no resources, and rather than speak, they make a high-pitched sound. They creep around deep in caves and are nurtured by serpents.

In Athenaeus
In his work Deipnosophists, Athenaeus wrote that Pythagoras who wrote about the Red Sea mentioned that they make their pandura out of the white mangrove which grows in the sea and that Euphorion in his book on the Isthmian Games mentioned that they played sambucas with four strings like the Parthians.

In Claudius Aelianus
In his work On the Characteristics of Animals, Claudius Aelianus mentions that the tribe of Troglodytae are famous and derive their name from their manner of living. He also adds that they eat snakes.
Furthermore, he wrote that Troglodytes believe that the king of the beasts is the Ethiopian Bull, because it possesses the courage of a lion, the speed of a horse, the strength of a bull, and is stronger than iron.

In Josephus
Flavius Josephus alludes to a place he calls Troglodytis while discussing the account in Genesis, that after the death of Sarah, Abraham married Keturah and fathered six sons who in turn fathered many more.  "Now, for all these sons and grandsons, Abraham contrived to settle them in colonies; and they took possession of Troglodytis, and the country of Arabia Felix..."

The Troglodytis Josephus refers to here is generally taken to mean both coasts of the Red Sea. However, Josephus goes on to state that the descendants of one of these grandsons, Epher, invaded Libya, and that the name of Africa was thus derived from that of Epher. The dominant modern hypothesis is that Africa stems from the Berber word ifri (plural ifran), meaning "cave", in reference to cave dwellers.

In Clement of Alexandria 
Clement of Alexandria (The Stromata, Book I, chapter xvi) mentions them as the inventors of sambuca.

In Eusebius
Eusebius, most likely citing Clement of Alexandria, also credits them with the invention of the sambuca.

See also

Afri, singular Afer – a Latin name for the inhabitants of the Africa Province
Blemmyes – a nomadic Beja tribal kingdom (at least 600 BCE – 3rd century CE)
Ichthyophagi – name given by ancient geographers to several coast-dwelling peoples in different parts of the world
Midian – area in the northwest Arabian Peninsula mentioned in the Hebrew Bible and the Koran, and associated with Ptolemy's Modiana
Zimran – the first son of Abraham and Keturah; their descendants are said by Josephus to have settled "Troglodytis" and Arabia Felix
Hijaz – the mountains on the Arabian coast of the Red Sea identified by Josephus
Thamud – a once-powerful nation occupying the northern tip of the Hijaz known for their cave-dwelling
Horites – a people of the northern Hijaz with an etymology of digging a hole for a den
Wadi Feiran – another name associated with the Hijaz and northwestern Arabia, the root "F-ˀA-R" means "mouse" and "burrowing like a mouse"
Chimpanzee – a great ape whose scientific name, P. troglodytes comes from the Troglodytae, out of an incorrect belief they lived and slept in caverns.

References

Further reading

 
 Murray, G.W. and E.H. Warmington (March 1967), "Trogodytica: The Red Sea Littoral in Ptolemaic Times", The Geographical Journal, Vol. 133, No. 1. pp. 24–33.

Tuareg
African nomads
Legendary tribes in Greco-Roman historiography